Hao Hongjun (born December 1962) is a former Chinese politician. As of February 2023 he was under investigation by China's top anti-corruption agency. Previously he served as chairman of the Dalian Municipal Committee of the Chinese People's Political Consultative Conference.  

He is a member of the 14th National Committee of the Chinese People's Political Consultative Conference.

Career
Born in December 1962, Hao joined the Chinese Communist Party (CCP) in April 1988. He once was a technician of Fuxin No. 2 Cable Power Plant. He moved to Fuxin Municipal Committee of the Communist Youth League, and eventually becoming its secretary. He than successively served as deputy party secretary, governor, and party secretary of Qinghemen District, deputy head and head of Fuxin Public Security Bureau, vice mayor of Yingkou and head of Yingkou Public Security Bureau, and secretary of Fushun Municipal Commission for Discipline Inspection.

He was appointed secretary of Dalian Municipal Commission for Discipline Inspection in June 2016 and was admitted to member of the Standing Committee of the CCP Dalian Municipal Committee, the city's top authority. He also served as Dalian Municipal Supervision Commission since January 2018.

He was Liaoning Provincial Commission for Discipline Inspection in December 2019, in addition to serving as deputy director of Liaoning Provincial Supervisory Commission.

In January 2022, he was chosen as chairman of the Dalian Municipal Committee of the Chinese People's Political Consultative Conference.

Investigation 
On 5 February 2023, he has been placed under investigation for "serious violations of laws and regulations" by the Central Commission for Discipline Inspection (CCDI), the party's internal disciplinary body, and the National Supervisory Commission, the highest anti-corruption agency of China.

References

1962 births
Living people
Chinese politicians
Chinese Communist Party politicians
Members of the 14th Chinese People's Political Consultative Conference